Gostinu is a commune located in Giurgiu County, Muntenia, Romania. It is composed of a single village, Gostinu.

References

External links

Communes in Giurgiu County
Localities in Muntenia
Populated places on the Danube